Mokhsogollokh (Moxsoğolloox) is an urban locality (an urban-type settlement) in Khangalassky District of the Sakha Republic, Russia, located on the left bank of the Lena River,  from Pokrovsk, the administrative center of the district. As of the 2010 Census, its population was 6,698.

History
Urban-type settlement status was granted to it in 1964.

Administrative and municipal status
Within the framework of administrative divisions, the urban-type settlement of Mokhsogollokh is incorporated within Khangalassky District as the Settlement of Mokhsogollokh. As a municipal division, the Settlement of Mokhsogollokh is incorporated within Khangalassky Municipal District as Mokhsogollokh Urban Settlement.

References

Notes

Sources
Official website of the Sakha Republic. Registry of the Administrative-Territorial Divisions of the Sakha Republic. Khangalassky District. 

Urban-type settlements in the Sakha Republic
Populated places on the Lena River